Davis Joseph Deza Mauricio (born 26 March 1992 in Lima) is a Peruvian football midfielder who currently plays for the Peruvian Primera División club Universitario de Deportes.

External links
 
 at goal.com

References

1992 births
Living people
Peruvian footballers
Association football midfielders
Club Universitario de Deportes footballers
Footballers from Lima